Karan Paul (born 3 November 1969) is the chairman of the Apeejay Surrendra Group, one of India's oldest and largest privately-owned family businesses. Established in Jalandhar in 1910, the Group has more than 43,000 employees across tea, hospitality, shipping, retail, real estate, and other sectors.

Early life
Born on November 3, 1969, Karan Paul is the grandson of Shri Pyare Lal, founder of the Group, and son of the late chairman, Surrendra Paul. He was born and brought up in Kolkata and New Delhi. He studied at La Martiniere for Boys, Kolkata and Modern High School, New Delhi. He went to Brown University, United States, for his undergraduate studies in philosophy and literature and majored in politics.

Career
Paul joined the Apeejay Surrendra Group in 1992. His first businesses were Apeejay Finance, a finance company and Apeejay Securities, a stockbroking company, which he ran for about ten years and sold them off in 2006-07. After working at various levels in the Apeejay Surrendra Group for 12 years, Karan became the Chairman of the Group in 2004.

Paul oversees the Group’s financial planning, business strategy, diversification into new businesses ventures and operations as well as management of Apeejay Tea, Apeejay Shipping and Apeejay Schools. Under his leadership, the Group has made large business investments and expanded across various businesses, especially its core businesses of shipping and hotels. The Group has forward integrated the tea plantation business by acquiring an FMCG brand Typhoo which retails in nearly 50 countries globally.
The Group also diversified into new business ventures of Marine Cluster and Logistics Parks which has backward and forward integrated the Group’s Shipping business. The Real Estate division has incremented Land Banks and consolidated as well as grown Real Estate commercial developments across India. Karan is director and member of Apeejay Surrendra Park Hotels Limited, K.P.H.Dream Cricket Private Limited and Director of Apeejay Tea Limited, Apeejay Shipping Limited, Apeejay Infralogistics Private Limited, Bengal Shipyard Limited amongst others.

Board memberships
Karan has been on the Executive Committees of various Chambers of Commerce like CII, FICCI, ICC, Bharat Chamber of Commerce, Bengal Chamber of Commerce; he is actively involved with reputed trade organizations and professional forums like YPO, YLF, INSA, ITA, etc. as well as West Bengal industry forums.

Awards
In 2006 Karan Paul was awarded one of Italy's highest honours 'Order of the Star of Italian Solidarity'  Gianni Vernetti, Minister of State of the Ministry of External Affairs, presented the decorations of the 'Order of the Star of Italian Solidarity' in New Delhi. Italy confers this award annually on Italian and Foreign nationals residing outside the country who have significantly contributed to the stature of Italy. It could either be by way of promoting Italian culture and language or by any other voluntary activity or humanitarian service. In 2012, International Confederation of NGO s felicitated Karan with its coveted ‘Karmaveer Puraskaar, 2012 Corporate Citizen for Holistic CSR Initiatives’ award. The award was given to him for his work in the field of social service and for interpreting his responsibilities as an individual and as the leader of the Apeejay Surrendra Group adjudicated by processes created by the international HR audit firm Mercer and Grant Thornton. Some of the initiatives created by him:-
 The Paul Foundation – In 2001, within less than a decade of joining business, Karan put in place a system of providing grants to students aiming for higher studies in India and abroad through The Paul Foundation.
 Social Sector Initiatives Program – In 2005, a year after he became Chairman, Karan evolved a comprehensive strategy that funnelled resources into the Social Sector (Children, Disabled, Women), Education, Environment and Stakeholder Relations, all executed through institutionalized processes at the corporate level. 
 Inclusive Sports – In 2015, a reward and recognition platform with UK’s national charity, the English Federation of Disability Sport (EFDS) was created to ensure that more disabled athletes have access to local competitions. It is the third time Karan has backed the charity’s work after sponsoring the Typhoo Sports for All project in 2009 and 2010 that funded free Disability Inclusion Training across the UK. More than 1000 disabled athletes took part of the regional qualifiers that led to the National Junior Athletics Championships climax in June 2015.
 Anand Paul Education Support Programme – In 2009, the program was started by Karan Paul to identify children from the poorest areas around Park Street, who had either dropped out of school or were not enrolled in school, and help them return to school. The program has also created additional lines of remedial support for children who were put back into school but were again in the danger of dropping out; to tackle the parents’ tendency to divert the child’s attention to other tasks by engaging the parents into adult literacy & skill training program.
 100 for 100 – The Group’s centenary in 2010 was celebrated with a 100 community initiatives by Karan to cornerstone Apeejay’s commitment to creating an equitable society and a sustainable business. Projects spread across education, environment, art & culture, capacity building of institutions especially those that help the disabled and focused on physical and mental health of children and women were designed and implemented. Projects that promoted professional growth and personal well-being of employees were created along with sustainable and well-funded cultural platforms created in cities where Apeejay’s businesses were flourishing.
 Volunteer Awards – Karan created India’s pioneering National Award for Volunteers, Volunteer engaging NGOs and Corporates with the best Employee Volunteering Policies in 2011. The Award took forward the Individual Social Responsibility (TM) program instituted by Karan in 2008 wherein should they choose to and want to do so, Apeejay employees have the opportunity to take ownership of social causes they believed in and do social work in office hours during a working week.
 Art, Heritage & Culture – Park Mansions, a residential and commercial building developed by Armenian jute merchant, T.M. Thaddeus in 1910, owned by Apeejay was carefully restored to its original glory under Karan’s direct supervision. The restoration effort earned the Group the CMC-INTACH Heritage Award 2013
 Sustainability – Karan has worked for many years now making his tea plantations rigorously implement global ‘Sustainable Agricultural Network’ (SAN) standards. The retail tea brand in the UK follows a pragmatic approach for corporate sustainability concentrating on improving environmental and ethical performance In 2015, Typhoo’s Indian arm launched India’s first certified teas to be marketed pan India while carrying the Rainforest Alliance sustainability seal. The seal is an assurance to customers that the product is sourced from certified farms that adhere to very stringent sustainable agriculture standards that protect environment, biodiversity, waterways, wildlife habitats and the rights and well-being of workers & their families.
 Human Wildlife Conflict mitigation – In 2015, Karan created a three-year exhaustive management strategy that will see the Group’s tea plantations company invest in reducing the impact of Human Elephant Conflict in Assam. The project being implemented in partnership with the Worldwide Fund for Nature (WWF) has many first-of-its-kind ideas built in with pilot projects to incubate these innovations in Apeejay’s own tea plantations. WWF is certain that the project will be able to decrease human and elephant mortality levels substantially from those recorded in 2013 in Assam tea plantations.

Personal

Karan is a sports enthusiast and loves the sport of cricket. He is the co-owner of the Punjab Kings (PBKS) team of the Indian Premier League (IPL) along with Preity Zinta, Ness Wadia and Mohit Burman. KXIP is a franchise cricket team with its headquarters in Mohali, Punjab. Karan has been reading serious literature from a very young age and his first love and abiding interest remains Philosophy and literature. He expresses views on issues he feels strongly about in occasional columns he writes for. Karan Paul is married to Indrani Dasgupta.together they have two children Uma Kismat Paul and Kabir Anand Paul

References 

1969 births
Brown University alumni
Living people
Indian billionaires